Euvola papyracea , or the paper scallop, is a species of bivalve mollusc in the family Pectinidae. It can be found in the Gulf of Mexico, ranging from the West Indies to Brazil.

References

Pectinidae
Molluscs described in 1873